The 1963 Federation Cup was the first edition of what is now known as the Fed Cup. The tournament was created provide a team competition for women, similar to the Davis Cup men's competition. 16 nations participated in the first event, which was held at the Queen's Club in London, United Kingdom from 17–20 June. United States won the first title, defeating Australia in the final.

Participating teams

Draw
All ties were played at the Queen's Club in London, United Kingdom on grass courts.

First round
Australia vs. Belgium

Hungary vs. Denmark

South Africa vs. Czechoslovakia

France vs. West Germany

Norway vs. Austria

Canada vs. Great Britain

Switzerland vs. Netherlands

Italy vs. United States

Quarterfinals
Australia vs. Hungary

South Africa vs. France

Austria vs. Great Britain

Netherlands vs. United States

Semifinals
Australia vs. South Africa

Great Britain vs. United States

Final

Notes

References

Billie Jean King Cups by year
Federation Cup
Federation Cup
Federation Cup
Federation Cup
Federation Cup
1963 in English tennis
1963 in English women's sport
June 1963 sports events in the United Kingdom